State Road 145 (NM 145) is a , paved, two-lane state highway in Hidalgo County in the U.S. state of New Mexico. NM 145's western terminus is at the road's junction with NM 80, right after the road turns north passing through Peloncillo Mountains. The road's eastern terminus is north of Cotton City at the highway's junction with NM 338. NM 145 is also known as Goat Camp Road.

Route description
NM 145 begins at the junction with NM 80, right after the road passes through the southern edge of Peloncillo Mountains, skirting the old lead mines. The road heads east through the arid sparsely populated desert plains occupied by ranchos. After 3.5 miles the road reaches its eastern terminus at the intersection with NM 338, just north of Cotton City.

History
The old Route 145 was created some time in 1930s, running from Route 184 near Black Springs to its intersection with Route 52. Shortly thereafter, Route 145 together with several other roads in the area were combined to form an extension of Route 78 which existed until 1988. After reorganization of 1988, the route was renamed NM 163.

A road connecting NM 80 to NM 338 first appears on the mid-1960s topographic maps, as a local paved highway. In 1988 the New Mexico Department of Transportation (NMDOT) went through a radical road renumbering program, and the local road was transferred to the State control, and designated as NM 145.

Major intersections

See also

References

External links

145
Transportation in Hidalgo County, New Mexico